The following is a list of notable word processors.

Free and open-source software
AbiWord
Apache OpenOffice Writer
Calligra Words
Collabora Online Writer – Online, Windows, Mac, Linux, Android, iOS, iPadOS, ChromeOS, an enterprise-ready edition of LibreOffice
GNU TeXmacs – document preparation system
Groff
LibreOffice Writer
LyX – TeX document processor
OnlyOffice Desktop Editors
TextEdit – Mac and Linux 
WordGrinder – minimalist TUI word processor

Proprietary software

Commercial
Apple Pages, part of its iWork suite – Mac, iOS
Applix Word – Linux
Atlantis Word Processor – Windows
DavkaWriter – Windows and Mac
Documents To Go – Android, iOS, Windows Mobile, Symbian
Final Draft – screenplay/teleplay word processor
Adobe FrameMaker – Windows
Gobe Productive Word Processor – Windows and Linux
Hangul (also known as HWP) – Windows, Mac and Linux
IA Writer – Mac, iOS
IBM DisplayWrite – DOS 
IBM SCRIPT – IBM VM/370
IBM SCRIPT/VS – IBM z/VM or z/OS systems
Ichitaro – Japanese word processor produced by JustSystems – Windows
Adobe InCopy – Mac and Windows
IntelliTalk
iStudio Publisher – Mac
Kingsoft Writer – Windows and Linux
Mathematica – technical and scientific word processing
Mellel – Mac
Microsoft Word – Windows and Mac
Nisus Writer – Mac
Nota Bene – Windows, Mac
Polaris Office – Android and Windows Mobile
PolyEdit – Windows
RagTime – Windows and Mac
Scrivener – Windows, Mac and Linux
TechWriter – RISC OS
Text Control – Word Processing SDK Library
TextMaker – Windows and Linux 
ThinkFree Office Write – Windows, Mac and Linux 
Ulysses – Mac, iPadOS, iOS
WordPad – previously known as "Write" in older versions than Windows 95; has been included in all versions of Windows since Windows 1.01.
WordPerfect – Windows and Linux

Freeware
Atlantis Nova – Windows
BabelPad – Windows
Baraha – free Indian language software
Bean – Mac
Jarte – Windows 
Kingsoft Writer Personal Edition
TextMaker

Online 
Apple Pages
Authorea – word processor for students and researchers
Collabora Online Writer – enterprise-ready edition of LibreOffice
Google Docs
Microsoft Word Online – free online service
OnlyOffice
ThinkFree Office Write
WriteOnline
XaitPorter – word processor for Enterprise, allowing both single-user and team collaboration approach

Historical

See also 
 Comparison of word processors
 List of office suites
 List of text editors

References 

Word processors